Jennie Loitman Barron (October 12, 1891 – March 28, 1969) was an American suffragist, lawyer, and judge. She was the first woman to present evidence to a Grand Jury in Massachusetts and the first to prosecute major criminal cases. She was the first woman judge appointed for life to the Municipal Court in Boston (1937), and the first woman appointed to the Massachusetts Superior Court (1959).

Family and education
Jennie Loitman Barron was born in Boston to Jewish Russian immigrant parents. She attended Girls' High School, graduating as valedictorian at 15. She received a B.A. and a law degree from Boston University, and opened her own law practice after graduating in 1914. In 1918 she married fellow lawyer Samuel Barron Jr., and they practiced together as Barron and Barron. The couple had three daughters: Erma Barron Wernick (b. 1919), Deborah Barron Blazar (1923–1956), and Joy Barron Rachlin (b. 1931).

Suffrage and other political work
Jennie Loitman Barron became interested in suffrage while a college student. She was the first president of the Boston University College Equal Suffrage Organization. She was invited by Maud Wood Park to speak at open-air meetings of the Boston Equal Suffrage Association for Good Government. In 1917, she was a street-corner speaker in New York City's suffrage campaign. Once suffrage was granted, Barron worked with the League of Women Voters to address irregular marriage and divorce laws across the country. She wrote the League's official statement arguing for women to serve on juries.

Barron was elected to the Boston School Committee from 1926 to 1929, the first mother to serve.

Legal work
Barron was an early president of the Massachusetts Association of Women Lawyers. In 1918 she organized a campaign to allow women to become notaries. She was an assistant Massachusetts Attorney General from 1934 to 1935. In 1937 she was named associate justice of the Boston Municipal Court, and served for twenty years. In 1959 Barron became an associate justice of the Massachusetts Superior Court, where she served until her death in 1969.

Barron was also the first female United States delegate to the United Nations Congress on Crime and Juvenile Delinquency.

She is remembered on the Boston Women's Heritage Trail.

References

External links
 Jennie L. Barron Papers. Schlesinger Library , Radcliffe Institute, Harvard University.
Jennie Loitman Barron entry in Jewish Women: A Comprehensive Historical Encyclopedia
Guide to the Papers of Jennie L. (Jennie Loitman) Barron (1891-1969) at the American Jewish Historical Society, New York.

1891 births
1969 deaths
American people of Russian-Jewish descent
Boston University School of Law alumni
Massachusetts lawyers
Massachusetts state court judges
Lawyers from Boston
Probation and parole officers
20th-century American judges
20th-century American women judges
20th-century American lawyers
Girls' High School (Boston, Massachusetts) alumni